Ernest W. Holmes Sr. (January 17, 1883– June 10, 1945) was born in Hobbs Island, Alabama. He became the inventor of the first tow truck when he fastened various parts to his 1913 Cadillac. He then founded Ernest Holmes Co, which still spiritually lives on through Miller Industries. He later would also serve a term as a member of the Electric Power Board of Chattanooga and the American Society of Automotive Engineers .

The birth of an idea 
Holmes got the idea after assisting a friend of his from business school, John Wiley, after Wiley's Model T flipped over into a ditch. Holmes then modified his 1913 Cadillac to pull cars and transport them to his garage by affixing an iron chain, a pulley, and several poles to the back of his Cadillac. Holmes quickly patented his invention, and thus the towing industry was born. He spent the next two years theorizing and forming a concrete idea, filing his patent on January 17, 1918.

The basis for Ernest Holmes Sr.'s patents was the unique concept of having a "split-boom" wrecker that could anchor the truck on one side, and retrieve from the other side without tilting the wrecker. This was especially useful when a wrecked vehicle had gone down a steep embankment.

Death 
Many would have said he was in stout health shortly before his death; sources say he went to a local course for a round of golf and then a bridge game the next day on Saturday. He was absolutely passionate about golf, never going a week without golfing unless he was traveling on business. At 4 o'clock on the morning of June 10, 1945, he woke his wife feeling unwell and dying shortly after that at the age of 62. Doctors declared that he had suffered from what they called a "heart aliment". His oldest child, Ernest Holmes Jr. was then swiftly elected to take over control of Holmes Co.  Holmes had said he would retire when he turned 65.

Other fields in which the wrecker was used 
A few wreckers were sold directly to the United States Government at the tail end of World War I, to be outfitted for military usage. They would be used in full force during the second World War were in which Holmes Co supplied the Allies with 6 to 7 thousand military tier wreckers. The regular wrecker was used in the American racing industry as it was the wrecker of choice for both NASCAR and IndyCar racing for multiple decades.

Impact of Holmes 

Holmes' invention has become the leading vehicle in rescuing  and transporting of vehicles that cannot be driven at the current time. The International Towing Museum was built in Chattanooga. It is a home to a collection and history of the tow truck and how it has evolved since its inception in the early 20th century. What was left of the Ernest Holmes Company, at that time owned by Dover, transformed into Miller Industries under the supervisor of his son Mildred Holmes. Miller Industries is headquartered in Ooltewah, TN

References

External links 
 http://internationaltowingmuseum.org/
 http://www.millerind.com/

1883 births
1945 deaths